A symphony is an extended piece of music for orchestra, especially one in sonata form.

Symphony or Symphonic may also refer to:

Music
 Symphony orchestra, an orchestra, which specializes in the performance of post-17th-century orchestral repertoire
 Symphony song, genre in the age of Purcell
 Symphonia, a name applied to several kinds of musical instruments in ancient times
 Symphonic metal, a genre of metal that incorporates its style from symphonies
 Symphony (El Khoury), a 1985 symphony by Bechara El Khoury
 Symphonies (Sallinen), compositions by Aulis Sallinen

Bands
 Symphony X, a progressive metal band

Albums
 Symphony (album), a 2008 album by Sarah Brightman
 Symphonic (Falco album), a live performance recorded in 1994 and released in 2008
 Symphonic (Jorn album), released in 2013
Symphonies (EP), a 2011 remix EP by In Fear and Faith

Songs
"Symphony" (Clean Bandit song), a 2017 song by Clean Bandit and Zara Larsson
"Symphony", a 1992 song by Donell Rush
"Symphony", a 1999 song by EPMD from the album Out of Business
"Symphony", a 2022 song by Imagine Dragons from the album Mercury – Acts 1 & 2
"Symphonie", a 2004 song by Silbermond from the album 
"Symphonies" (song), a 2009 song by British artist Dan Black from the album UN
"The Symphony" (song), a song by Marley Marl from the 1988 album In Control, Volume 1

Computer science
 Symphony Communication a communication tool
 Symphony (software), a distributed computing software
 IBM Lotus Symphony, an office suite for Windows, Macintosh and Linux
 Lotus Symphony (DOS), an office suite for DOS from the 1980s
 Symphony, codename for Windows XP Media Center Edition 2005
 COIN-OR SYMPHONY, a software library for solving a specific class of operations research problems
 Symfony, a web application framework written in PHP

Radio, film and games
 Symphony 92.4FM, a Singaporean radio channel
 Symphony (video game), a 2012 music-based shoot-em-up video game
 Symphony (film), a 2004 Malayalam-language Indian feature film directed by I. V. Sasi

Technology and brands
 Symphony (MBTA station), an underground subway stop in Boston, Massachusetts
 Symphony Aircraft Industries, a light aircraft manufacturer
 Symphony Technology Group, a private company based in Palo Alto, California
 Symphonic, a defunct electronics brand formerly manufactured by Funai
 Symphony, a turbofan engine under development by Boom Supersonic

Other
 Symphony (grape), a type of grape used to make white wine
 Symphony, the ring name of professional wrestling valet Alicia Webb
 Symphony (Agendia), a suite of gene assays
 Symphony, the magazine of the League of American Orchestras
 Symphony (candy), a chocolate candy bar manufactured by Hershey's
 , a huge 2018 cruise ship

See also 
 Symphonia (disambiguation)
 Symphonie, communications satellites from a Franco-German program
 Symphogear, a 2012 musical action anime series